Más allá de la muerte, is a Mexican telenovela produced by Ernesto Alonso in 1969, this production is known as the first color telenovela produced in Mexico. His chain was Televicentro (now Televisa) and was led by Julissa and Carlos Bracho.

Plot 
In Puebla in mid-nineteenth century, a pretty girl ahead of her time living Estela Ballesteros. Because she suffers from a heart injury, Estela Family allows you certain freedoms, such as studying art with painter Octavio Duran and sustain a romance with reprehensible Angel Montalvan.

Cast 
Julissa as Estela Ballesteros
Carlos Bracho as Ángel Montalván
Ernesto Alonso as Octavio Durán
Emily Cranz as Malena
Aarón Hernán
Hortensia Santoveña
Carlos Ancira as Gabriel Montalván
Miguel Manzano as Ramón Ballesteros
Norma Herrera as Hildegard

References 

Mexican telenovelas
Televisa telenovelas
Spanish-language telenovelas
1969 telenovelas